The 134th Infantry Division (German: 134. Infanterie-Division) was a German division in World War II. It was formed in October 1940.

From June 1941, the 134th Infantry Division took part in the invasion of the Soviet Union as part of the Army Group Center. In December 1941, the division was involved in the Battle of Moscow. Together with the 45th Infantry Division, she was temporarily surrounded as part of the 2nd Army at Livny and lost a large part of her artillery.
The division was destroyed in the Soviet Bobruysk Offensive, part of Operation Bagration in the summer of 1944.

Orders of Battle

134. Infanterie-Division 1940
Infanterie-Regiment 439
Infanterie-Regiment 445
Infanterie-Regiment 446
Artillerie-Regiment 134
Aufklärungs-Abteilung 134
Pionier-Bataillon 134
Panzerjäger-Abteilung 134
Divisions-Nachrichten-Abteilung 134
Divisions-Nachschubführer 134

134. Infanterie-Division 1944
Grenadier-Regiment 439
Grenadier-Regiment 445
Grenadier-Regiment 446
Artillerie-Regiment 134
Divisions-Füsilier-Bataillon 134
Panzerjäger-Abteilung 134
Pionier-Bataillon 134
Feldersatz-Bataillon 134
Divisions-Nachrichten-Abteilung 134
Divisions-Nachschubführer 134

Commanding officers
Generalleutnant Conrad von Cochenhausen, 5 October 1940 – 12 December 1941, (committed suicide after the defeat at Livny)
General Hans Schlemmer, 12 December 1941 – February 1944,
Generalmajor Rudolf Bader, February 1944 – 1 June 1944,
Generalleutnant Ernst Philipp, 1 June 1944 – 29 June 1944 (committed suicide after the destruction of his division).

Infantry divisions of Germany during World War II
Military units and formations established in 1940
Military units and formations disestablished in 1944